Telim Kandi (also Romanized as Telīm Kandī; also known as Telem Kandī) is a village in Kolah Boz-e Gharbi Rural District, in the Central District of Meyaneh County, East Azerbaijan Province, Iran. At the 2006 census, its population was 199, in 43 families.

References 

Populated places in Meyaneh County